Strath Creek is a town in central Victoria, Australia.

History
Strath Creek Post Office opened on 16 April 1885.

Today
The town was affected by the Black Saturday bushfires in February 2009, with the picturesque Hume and Hovell cricket ground barely escaping the flames. The cricket ground is based on the famous Lord's in England, having the same dimensions and a similar slope.

References

External links

Profile of Strath Creek
Strath Creek Community Portal

Towns in Victoria (Australia)
Shire of Murrindindi